FC Partizan may refer to:

FC Partizan Minsk
FC Partizan Cherven Bryag

See also
FK Partizan (disambiguation)
NK Partizan (disambiguation)
TJ Partizán Domaniža
Partizán Bardejov